Meatmen: An Anthology of Gay Male Comics is a series of paperback books collecting short comics featuring gay and bisexual male characters. The comics included a mixture of explicit erotica and humor. Between 1986 and 2004, 26 black-and-white volumes of the series (160–200 pages each) were published by Leyland Publications, making it the longest-running anthology of gay male pornographic comics. 

During its run, the series was said to feature "every gay male cartoonist of note who has worked since the 1970s". Cartoonists whose work was featured include Tim Barela, Belasco, Bruce Billings, John Blackburn, Howard Cruse, Donelan (two front covers and many back covers), Kurt Erichsen, Patrick Fillion, Prof. I.B. Gittendowne (Rupert Kinnard), Michael Goldberg, The Hun (Bill Schmeling), A. Jay, Al Shapiro, Joe Johnson, Jeffrey A. Krell, Mike Kuchar, Jon Macy, Jerry Mills, Nico (early covers), Brad Parker (early back covers), Sean (John Klamik), Stephen (Dom Orejudos), Tom of Finland (Touko Laaksonen), Robert Triptow, Vaughn, Bill Ward, and Zack (Oliver Frey).

In 2001, copies of Meatmen vol. 18 and 24 imported by Little Sister's bookstore of Vancouver, British Columbia were classified as "obscene" and seized by Canada Customs. This led to the case Little Sisters Book and Art Emporium v Canada, which was eventually decided by the Supreme Court of Canada in 2007.

See also 
 Gay Comix

References

External links 
 Leyland Publications web site

Comics anthologies
Comics publications
LGBT-related comics
1986 comics debuts
2004 comics endings
Underground comix
Erotic comics
Humor comics
Gay male pornographic comics
1980s LGBT literature